In mathematics, the cyclotomic identity states that

where M is Moreau's necklace-counting function,

and μ is the classic Möbius function of number theory.  

The name comes from the denominator, 1 − z j, which is the product of cyclotomic polynomials.

The left hand side of the cyclotomic identity is the generating function for the free associative algebra on α generators, and the right hand side is the generating function for the universal enveloping algebra of the free Lie algebra on α generators. The cyclotomic identity witnesses the fact that these two algebras are isomorphic. 

There is also a symmetric generalization of the cyclotomic identity found by Strehl:

References

Mathematical identities
Infinite products